The meteor hammer, often referred to simply as meteor, is an ancient Chinese weapon,  consisting at its most basic level of two weights connected by a rope or chain. One of the flexible or "soft" weapons, it is referred to by many different names worldwide, dependent upon region, construction and intended use. Other names in use include dai chui, flying hammer, or dragon's fist.  It belongs to the broader classes of flail and chain weapons. There is little evidence that they saw use in actual historical combat.

Design

A meteor hammer consists of a flexible chain or rope with a weight attached to one or both ends. Their construction is similar to a bola, but they are heavier and are not suitable for throwing. As a flexible weapon, meteor hammers can be easily concealed, and may be used as a defensive or surprise weapon.

Using a meteor hammer involves swinging the weight around the body to build up angular momentum, and then striking at the target. If the weight is swung around the intended target, the long length of chain may become wrapped around the body, limbs, or weapons.

Types

There are two types of meteor hammers: a double-headed and a single-headed version.

The double-headed meteor hammer is typically 2–3 meters in length with a spherical head on each end. While the ends of the meteor hammer can be heavier than a rope dart head, the difference in weight is normally minimal. Some meteor hammers have much lighter heads. The lighter versions of this weapon are typically used for practice and for modern wushu displays since they are faster and less dangerous. Since the meteor has two heads, one can be used offensively while the other can be used to defend, parrying attacks or ensnaring an opponent's weapon to attempt to disarm them.

The single-headed version of this weapon is used in a similar manner to the rope dart in that it is a long reach weapon with a single head. The main difference between the headed meteor hammer and a rope dart is that traditionally the meteor hammer has a rounded head. Because of these traits, a single headed meteor hammer can deliver a great amount of force to a target, however it is very difficult to control.

In popular culture

 In the 1978 film Crippled Avengers, Mr. Wan, played by Wang Lung Wei, was an expert with the weapon.
 In the 2000 film Crouching Tiger, Hidden Dragon, a warrior use dual melon hammers in the tavern fight scene.
 In the 2000 film Romeo Must Die, Jet Li uses a fire hose as a makeshift version of the weapon.
 In the 2000 film Shanghai Noon, Jackie Chan uses a rope and horseshoe to fashion a makeshift version of the weapon.
 In the 2003 film Kill Bill: Volume 1, Gogo Yubari, played by Chiaki Kuriyama, uses a modern version of the weapon.
 In the 2005 film The Promise, General Guangming, played by Hiroyuki Sanada, was an expert with the weapon.
 In the 2007 TV series Juken Sentai Gekiranger, the GekiHammer is based on the meteor hammer.
 In the 2008 TV series Power Rangers Jungle Fury, the Jungle Mace is based on the meteor hammer.
 In the 2011 book Assassin's Creed: The Secret Crusade, Moloch (also known as "The Bull"), one of the protagonist Altaïr's targets, uses a meteor hammer with "unfailing accuracy" and ruthlessness.
 In the 2014 light novel series Re:Zero − Starting Life in Another World, Rem is an expert with this weapon.
 In the 2021 TV series Kung Fu, one of the eight sacred weapons is a meteor hammer.

See also

 Bolas
 Chain whip
 Chigiriki
 Eskimo yo-yo
 Fire dancing
 List of martial arts weapons
 List of mêlée weapons
 Meteor (juggling)
 Morning star (weapon)
 Nunchaku
 Poi (juggling)
 Rope dart
 Suruchin
 Zhou Tong (archer)

References

External links
 Fire Meteor Tribe.net
 Freestyle Meteor Info Page
 Shaolin Kung Fu Australia
 The Chinese Olympic Committee Official Website
 Rare Kung Fu Weapons
 Nine Dragon Baguazhang

Ancient weapons
Chain and rope throwing weapons
Chinese melee weapons
Primitive weapons